Brijesh Damani (born 22 November 1982 at Kolkata, West Bengal) is an Indian professional snooker player. He won the 2008 Indian National Snooker Championship. He also won silver medal in 2010 Asian Games in China. Brijesh did his school from Shri Daulatram Nopany Vidyalaya, Kolkata

Performance and rankings timeline

Career finals

Team finals: 1

Amateur finals: 1

References 

Indian snooker players
1982 births
Living people
Sportspeople from Kolkata
Asian Games medalists in cue sports
Asian Games silver medalists for India
Cue sports players at the 2010 Asian Games
Medalists at the 2010 Asian Games
Cue sports players from West Bengal